This article lists the commanders of the Blackshirts (MVSN, "Voluntary Militia for National Security"), a paramilitary wing of the Italian National Fascist Party (PNF), between the years of 1923 and 1943.

Commandants−General 

The Commandant-General of the Blackshirts was the supreme commander of the Blackshirts.

List of officeholders

Timeline

Chiefs of Staff 

The Chief of Staff of the Blackshirts oversaw the day-to-day operations of the Blackshirts.

List of officeholders

Timeline

See also 

 List of secretaries of Italian Fascist parties

Notes

References 

Commanders
Blackshirts commanders
1923 establishments in Italy
1943 disestablishments in Italy